The European Marine Board is a pan-European network of national organizations involved in marine research which are either research funding organizations (e.g. research councils or ministries), research performing organizations (e.g. national marine research institutes), or nationally based consortia of third-level institutes (e.g. university consortia). The European Marine Board (EMB) is the leading European think tank in marine science policy. The Board
provides a platform for its member organizations to develop common priorities, to advance marine research, and to bridge the gap between science and policy to meet future marine science challenges and opportunities.
Established in 1995, it is a partnership facilitating enhanced cooperation between European organizations involved in marine science towards development of a common vision on the research priorities and strategies for marine science in Europe. It also facilitates enhanced cooperation between stakeholders involved in supporting, delivering and using marine research and technology.

The European Marine Board was established in 1995 as an expert Board of the European Science Foundation (ESF). In 2016, the European Marine Board established its own legal organization as an international non-profit organisation under Belgian law, EMB-IVZW. Eight Founding Members signed the deed in the presence of a Notary Public at a dedicated founding meeting in Brussels on 20 January. EMB-IVZW became fully independent of ESF as of 1 January 2017.
The Secretariat of the European Marine Board is based at the InnovOcean site in the harbour of Ostend, Belgium, with office accommodation and support provided by the Flemish Government, through the Flanders Marine Institute (VLIZ).

Objectives and Modes of Operation

Mission Statement

The Marine Board provides a pan-European platform for its member organizations to develop common priorities, to advance marine research, and to bridge the gap between science and policy in order to meet future marine science challenges and opportunities.

Aim

The European Marine Board facilitates enhanced cooperation between European marine science organizations (research performing and research funding organizations) towards the development of a common vision on the research priorities and strategies for marine science in Europe. The European Marine Board provides the essential components for transferring knowledge from the scientific community to decision makers, promoting Europe's leadership in marine research and technology. Adopting a strategic role, the European Marine Board serves its member organizations by providing a forum within which marine research policy advice to national agencies and to the European Commission is developed, with the objective of promoting the establishment of the European Research Area for marine research.

Activities and Instruments
1. Production of strategic publications on marine science issues:
 Position papers
 Policy Briefs
 Future Science Briefs
 Vision Documents
 Science Commentaries
 Statements and consultation responses
2. Organization of marine science-policy conferences, events, meetings and workshops, including:
 Marine Board Biennial Open Forum
 EurOCEAN conferences (www.euroceanconferences.eu)
 Brown Bag Lunches
 Events at the European Parliament
 Direct interaction with policy makers
3. Hosting of thematic panels:
 Marine Board Communications Panel
 Universities Consortium Panel
4. Participation in strategic EU projects (normally supported by the EU Framework Programme)
 ERA-NETs 
 Coordination and Support Actions (CSA)
 European Maritime and Fisheries Fund (EMFF) tenders
5. Ongoing information and advice to members on developments in European marine science and science policy.

6. Participation in external stakeholder Advisory Panels.

Membership

Three kinds of organizations are eligible for Marine Board membership:

 National Research Performing Organizations (e.g. major national marine or oceanographic institutes);
 National Research Funding Organizations (e.g. national research councils and ministries which fund marine research); and
 Consortia of national third-level institutes (membership was opened to this category in 2010 on the basis of agreed criteria included in the Marine Board guidelines)

Membership is open to eligible organizations from countries which are part of the Council of Europe. Membership is restricted to a maximum of four organizations per country.

Governance

The Marine Board comprises three layers of governance:

 The Board
 The Executive Committee
 The Secretariat

The Board

The Board consists of representatives of the member organizations, each represented by a delegate and an alternate. The Board meets in plenary twice per year in spring and autumn. The Board is the highest level of governance and makes decisions on activities, strategic directions and operational principles of the European Marine Board. Decisions are generally reached by consensus; voting is normally only required for ExCom elections.

The Executive Committee

The Executive Committee (ExCom) is composed of the Marine Board Chair, six vice-Chairs and the Executive Director (as ex officio member), who is the Head of the European Marine Board Secretariat. The Chair and vice-Chairs are elected by the Marine Board member organizations. The Chair and vice-Chairs do not represent their organizations at the Marine Board ExCom. They act in the best interest of the Marine Board and its objectives. The ExCom meets 3 times per year to provide oversight and guidance to the Secretariat in implementing ongoing European Marine Board activities and to formulate strategic guidance to the Board on future activities and directions.

The Secretariat

The Secretariat supports the overall coordination and management of the European Marine Board and implements the decisions and activities approved by the Board and ExCom. Reporting directly to the European Marine Board and ExCom, the Secretariat is responsible for serving as the principal focal point for the European Marine Board member organizations and as a facilitator between the member organizations and the European Commission and other agencies. As a continuous task, the European Marine Board Secretariat monitors marine research and science policy developments, keeping abreast of developments at national, European and global levels.
Depending on the level of activity, core Secretariat activities require a minimum team of three Science Officers and an Executive and Finance Officer, under the management of an Executive Director.

External links 
 European Marine Board

References

Maritime organizations